The First cabinet of Geir Haarde in Iceland was formed 15 June 2006.

Cabinet

Inaugural cabinet: 15 June 2006 – 24 May 2007

See also
Government of Iceland
Cabinet of Iceland

References

Geir Haarde, First cabinet of
Geir Haarde, First cabinet of
Geir Haarde, First cabinet of
Cabinets established in 2006
Cabinets disestablished in 2007
Independence Party (Iceland)
Progressive Party (Iceland)